was a Japanese athlete. He competed in the men's discus throw at the 1928 Summer Olympics.

References

External links
 

1907 births
Year of death missing
Place of birth missing
Japanese male discus throwers
Olympic male discus throwers
Olympic athletes of Japan
Athletes (track and field) at the 1928 Summer Olympics
Japan Championships in Athletics winners
20th-century Japanese people